Macuelizo is a municipality in the Honduran department of Santa Bárbara.

Demographics
At the time of the 2013 Honduras census, Macuelizo municipality had a population of 34,401. Of these, 83.03% were Mestizo, 12.36% White, 2.26% Black or Afro-Honduran, 0.86% Indigenous and 1.49% others.

References

Municipalities of the Santa Bárbara Department, Honduras

es:Macuelizo